KNDS-LP is a low power radio station broadcasting on 96.3 FM in Fargo, North Dakota. The station is operated by the student broadcasting club at North Dakota State University (NDSU) in Fargo, North Dakota.

History
In 1999 students at NDSU worked with Professor Douglas Blanks Hindman to launch ThunderRadio, a Shoutcast Web radio station, and apply for a low-power FM license. After Hindman left NDSU for a position at a university in the state of Washington, Cloy Tobola, who was a doctoral student and graduate assistant at the time, took up the cause. With the help of Tobola and several students, what is now KNDS came together. About the same time, a group affiliated with the Fargo Theatre (later known as Radio Free Fargo) organized to start a community-focused station. These groups combined their efforts and license applications, and KNDS-LP began operating in 2004.

Some have argued that KNDS-LP was created in response to the loss of college radio in Fargo after NDSU-owned KDSU 91.9 FM became a public radio station through North Dakota Public Radio (now Prairie Public) on NDPR's launch in 1999.

In fact KDSU, which had started at the university in 1922, had ceased to be a student-run station by the mid-1970s when it affiliated with National Public Radio. For the quarter century or so afterward, students were employed at the station as studio monitors, interns and occasionally as on-air talent thanks to a subsidy from NDSU's student government; however, station management was handled by university employees and programming was essentially "public radio" fare. In short, the station was owned by a university but it would not be fair to describe its operations or programming as "college radio" during that period.

In the summer of 2003, KNDS-LP was granted its original construction permit for a low power station by the Federal Communications Commission (FCC). Over the next year, Tobola worked with NDSU students and representatives of Radio Free Fargo to secure studio space, networking services and equipment from the university, and to finalize operational roles for station managers. Because construction permits are only valid for one year, several short-term extensions were granted by the FCC. The last of these was issued on September 1, 2004; consequently, that date - and not the original 2003 date - appears on FCC records as the date of the construction permit.

The station marked its first FM broadcast at 11 AM CDT, on October 11, 2004, under the direction of General Manager Matthew Langemo. The FCC granted the station its broadcast license on August 29, 2005. In May 2007, KNDS moved frequency from 105.9 FM to 96.3 FM to prevent interference from KQLX-FM 106.1, which recently upgraded its signal.

The original KNDS studio was on the east side of University Drive at Administration Avenue in Fargo. A small brick building there originally housed a U.S. Post Office substation in the south side of the building and a credit union in the north half of the building. When the credit union moved, NDSU made the space available for the first KNDS studios. The station moved in April 2014 to the lower level of the High Plains Reader building at 124 8th St. North in Fargo. The building that housed the original KNDS studios was demolished in 2016 to expand the nearby NDSU parking lot.

Programming

Depending on the radio programs on KNDS, the station plays a wide range of music that attempts to break out of the strict music radio formats. Each DJ is allowed to make his or her own playlist for the program/shift. Thunder Radio and Radio Free Fargo also play music from local artists. KNDS has also become a respected broadcaster of NDSU Bison athletics, airing more than 70 games a year from a variety of sports, including Bison football, volleyball, men's and women's basketball, baseball, and softball. The sports broadcasts are led by NDSU students and gives the students broadcast experience and training for professional opportunities beyond college.

In 2010, some of the station programs began podcasting.

See also
List of community radio stations in the United States

References

External links
KNDS Radio official website
KNDS on MySpace
The History of KDSU Radio at North Dakota State University
 

NDS-LP
NDS-LP
North Dakota State University
Community radio stations in the United States
NDS-LP
Radio stations established in 2004
2004 establishments in North Dakota